Nikolai Nikolaevich Saksonov (6 January 1923 – 2 November 2011) was a Russian weightlifter. He competed for the Soviet Union at the 1952 Olympics and won a silver medal in the featherweight division (−60 kg). The following year he won a world title in the same division. During his career Saksonov set nine world records: seven official records in the clean and jerk  and two unofficial records in the total.

Biography 
In 1940–1941 Saksonov studied at naval and infantry military schools, and later fought as a sergeant in World War II. During a raid behind the front lines he captured an injured German combatant and brought him to the Soviet positions despite being wounded himself. For this feat he was awarded the Order of the Red Star. He took part in various other military operations, for which he was awarded the Order of the Patriotic War and the Medal of Bravery, among other medals.

After retiring from sport, in the 1960s Saksonov defended a PhD in medicine and later headed the Department of Athletics of the State Central Institute of Physical Culture.

References

External links

1923 births
2011 deaths
People from Perm Krai
People from Permsky Uyezd
Russian male weightlifters
Soviet male weightlifters
Olympic weightlifters of the Soviet Union
Weightlifters at the 1952 Summer Olympics
Olympic silver medalists for the Soviet Union
Olympic medalists in weightlifting
Medalists at the 1952 Summer Olympics
European Weightlifting Championships medalists
World Weightlifting Championships medalists
Sportspeople from Perm Krai